Ngô Ngọc Hưng (born 19 January 1998), known professionally as Hanbin is a Vietnamese singer active in South Korea as a member of the boy group Tempest. He had previously competed on the Mnet reality show I-Land, gathering popularity through the survival show. He gained recognition as the first Vietnamese idol in a Korean boy group.

Early life 
Hanbin (Ngô Ngọc Hưng), was born in Yên Bái City, Vietnam. He self-learned dancing since he was 15, according to his online fanmeeting. He moved to Hanoi for university where he founded and led a dance group, C.A.C, for three years (2016–2019) under the stage name Hưng Bin. Hanbin started training in July 2019, according to his I-LAND profile, after passing the audition in Hanoi.

Career

2020–2021: I-LAND, first fanmeeting, and agency changes 
On 2 June 2020, he was introduced as a participant in the CJ ENM and HYBE's then upcoming survival show I-Land. On the first episode, he performed "Jopping" by SuperM, along with NI-KI and Nicholas, but was unfortunately 'eliminated' by voting among the trainees and was placed in "Ground". On the 7th episode, he ranked 12th based on the global votes and was able to move onto Part 2 and become one of the final 12. On Episode 10, Hanbin ranked 4th out of 11 trainees in Global Voting with 1,415,420 votes. On Episode 11, he was eliminated by the producers.

Following his elimination on I-LAND, on 20 October, Belift Lab announced that Hanbin would be holding an online fanmeeting called Hanbin !00% on 31 October. On 16 December, he opened up a Twitter account on which he gathered over 150,000 followers in 24 hours. On 31 December, Hanbin performed a solo pre-opening stage at Big Hit NYEL Concert to the song "I&Credible."

On 2 June 2021, Belift Lab announced that Hanbin had left the agency following discussions with one another. Later that day, it was revealed that Hanbin had signed with Yuehua Entertainment.

2022: Debut with TEMPEST 
On 3 January 2022, Hanbin was introduced as the fifth member of the group TEMPEST. They debuted on 2 March 2022 with the mini album It's Me, It's We. With this debut he marked himself as the first Vietnamese male to debut in a K-pop boy group.

Discography

Filmography

Television

Concerts and tours
Fanmeets

 Hanbin !00% (2021)

Notes

References

External links
 

Living people
21st-century South Korean singers
K-pop singers
South Korean male dancers
South Korean male idols
South Korean male pop singers
1998 births
Yuehua Entertainment artists
Vietnamese singers
Vietnamese male singers
21st-century Vietnamese male singers